John J. Pacek  (June 11, 1914 – December 3, 1988), better known by the ring name Johnny Paychek, was an American boxer.  Though considered a journeyman, he did face Joe Louis in 1940 for the lineal heavyweight title. Louis beat him by a second-round knockout, in what turned to be Paychek's only world championship  try as a professional boxer.

After retiring from the ring, Paychek married and had two children. A longtime resident of Lyons, Illinois, Paychek died on December 3, 1988, at La Grange Memorial Hospital in La Grange Park, Illinois.

Country singer Johnny Paycheck took his stage name as a tribute or reference to Paychek.

References

External links 
Joe Louis vs. Johnny Paychek, 1940

1914 births
1988 deaths
American male boxers
Heavyweight boxers